Darlene K. Taylor (born January 29, 1950) is an American politician. She is a member of the Georgia House of Representatives from the 173rd District, serving since 2008. She is a member of the Republican party.

References

External links 
 Darlene Taylor at ballotpedia.org

Living people
Republican Party members of the Georgia House of Representatives
1950 births
People from Thomasville, Georgia
21st-century American politicians
21st-century American women politicians
Women state legislators in Georgia (U.S. state)